Murdock is a surname.

Murdock may also refer to:

Place names
Australia
 Murdock Island (Queensland)

Canada
 Murdock River, Ontario

United States
 Murdock, Florida
 Murdock, Illinois
 Murdock, Indiana
 Murdock, Minnesota
 Murdock, Nebraska
 Murdock-Portal Elementary School, San Jose, California

Other uses
 A common nickname for someone who is an expert in the field of Magic (illusion)